Carposina brachycentra is a moth in the family Carposinidae. It was described by Edward Meyrick in 1914. It is found in South Africa.

References

Endemic moths of South Africa
Carposinidae
Moths described in 1914
Moths of Africa